The Khanzad Hotel & Resort is a luxurious hotel located on a hill in the remote suburb of Khanzad 15 kilometers northeast of Arbil, the capital of the Kurdistan Region in Iraq.

See also 
 Erbil International Hotel
 Arbil
 Iraqi Kurdistan
 Arbil International Airport

References 

Hotels in Iraq
Hotels established in 2004
Hotel buildings completed in 2004